Rayners Lane is a London Underground station in the district of Rayners Lane in north west London, amid a 1930s development originally named Harrow Garden Village. The station is on the Uxbridge branch of both the Metropolitan line, between Eastcote and West Harrow stations, and the Piccadilly line, between Eastcote and South Harrow stations. The station is located to the west of the junction of Rayners Lane, Alexandra Avenue and Imperial Drive (A4090). It is in Travelcard Zone 5. Just east of the station, the Piccadilly and Metropolitan lines tracks join for services to Uxbridge and separate for those to Central London.

History
The Metropolitan Railway (Harrow and Uxbridge Railway) constructed the line between Harrow on the Hill and Uxbridge and commenced services on 4 July 1904 with, initially, Ruislip being the only intermediate stop. At first, services were operated by steam trains, but track electrification was completed in the subsequent months and electric trains began operating on 1 January 1905.

Progressive development in the north Middlesex area over the next two decades led to the gradual opening of additional stations along the Uxbridge branch to encourage the growth of new residential areas. Rayners Lane opened as Rayners Lane Halt on 26 May 1906, and was named after a local farmer called Daniel Rayner.  It was nicknamed Pneumonia Junction because of its exposed location

On 1 March 1910, an extension of the District line was opened from South Harrow to connect with the Metropolitan Railway at Rayners Lane junction east of the station enabling District line trains to serve stations between Rayners Lane and Uxbridge from that date. On 23 October 1933, District line services were replaced by Piccadilly line trains.

Design
The station, more a halt, was rebuilt, following the start of house building in the locality in the 1930s that saw passenger figures rise from 22,000 per annum in 1930 to 4 millions in 1937 by a new station to a design by Charles Holden and Reginald Uren that opened on 8 August 1938. Work had started in earnest with the opening of a temporary timber booking hall and shops on 14 March 1935 allowing work on the new station to proceed. The station, now Grade II Listed by Historic England, features the large cube-shaped brick and glass ticket hall capped with a flat reinforced concrete roof and geometrical forms typical of the new stations built in this period. To the west of the station, there is a reversing siding between the running tracks and, during the day, half of the Piccadilly line service reverses here. Two sidings were located south of the station but these were no longer used: with no connection with the running lines.  In late 2017 these sidings were lifted.

Services

Metropolitan line 
The Metropolitan Line is the only line to operate an express service, though currently for Metropolitan Line trains on the Uxbridge branch this is eastbound only in the morning peaks (06:30 to 09:30) Monday to Friday.

Metropolitan Line trains are able to terminate at Rayners Lane from the westbound platform either by a crossover to the east of the station or via a center reversing siding to the west, under normal circumstances all westbound Metropolitan Line trains continue to the terminus of the branch at Uxbridge.

The off-peak service in trains per hour (tph) is:
 8tph Eastbound to Aldgate (all stations)
 8tph Westbound to Uxbridge

The morning peak service in trains per hour (tph) is:
 2tph Eastbound to Aldgate (semi-fast, running non-stop between Harrow-on-the-Hill and Wembley Park)
 4tph Eastbound to Aldgate (all stations)
 4tph Eastbound to Baker Street (all stations)
 10tph Westbound to Uxbridge

The evening peak service in trains per hour (tph) is:
 7tph Eastbound to Aldgate (all stations)
 3tph Eastbound to Baker Street (all stations)
 10tph Westbound to Uxbridge

Piccadilly line 
Piccadilly line trains are also able to terminate here by means of a crossover to the east of the station (separate from the Metropolitan Line crossover) and via the center reversing siding although only the latter is used in normal service.

Between Rayners Lane and Uxbridge there is no Piccadilly Line service before approximately 06:30 (Monday - Friday) and 08:45 (Saturday - Sunday), except for one early morning
departure from Uxbridge at 05:18 (Monday - Saturday) and 06:46 (Sunday).

The off-peak service in trains per hour (tph) is:
 6tph Eastbound to Cockfosters
 3tph Westbound to Uxbridge
 3tph Terminate Here

The peak time service in trains per hour (tph) is:
 12tph Eastbound to Cockfosters
 8tph Westbound to Uxbridge
 4tph Terminate Here

Connections
London Buses routes 398, H9, H10 and H12 serve the station.

References

External links
 
 
  One platform shows a London Underground style roundel name board, the other a Metropolitan Railway Diamond name board.

Gallery

Metropolitan line stations
Piccadilly line stations
Tube stations in the London Borough of Harrow
Former Metropolitan Railway stations
Railway stations in Great Britain opened in 1906
Charles Holden railway stations
Grade II listed buildings in the London Borough of Harrow
Grade II listed railway stations
1906 establishments in England